Dimnat Chadir  is a city in  Dimnat Khadir District, Tiaz Governorate of Yemen.

In 2005 it had a population of 25.763 inhabitants and is the 26th largest town in Yemen.

References
   

Populated places in Al Hudaydah Governorate